Pierse is both a surname and a given name. The name originated from the Anglo-Saxon culture of Britain during the late Middle Ages, meaning "son of Peter". Notable people with the surname or given name include:

Surname
Annamay Pierse (born 1983), Canadian swimmer
Catherine Pierse, Irish solicitor
Peter Pierse (1947-1991), Australian rugby league referee
Toddy Pierse (1898-1968), Irish Gaelic footballer

Given
Pierse Loftus (1877-1956), Irish-born British businessman and politician
Pierse Long (1739-1789), American merchant
Pierse Joseph Mackesy (1883-1956), Irish-born British Army officer

See also
Peirse (disambiguation)
Pierce (disambiguation)
Piers (disambiguation)